The World University Badminton Championships is a competition sponsored by the International University Sports Federation (FISU), which was first held in 1990 in Nicosia, Cyprus.

Competitions

Results

2002 Kraków

2004 Bangkok

2008 Braga

2010 Taipei

2012 Gwangju

2014 Córdoba

2016 Ramenskoye

2018 Kuala Lumpur

See also
 Badminton at the Summer Universiade

References

Badminton
University